In chemistry, the adjective Ferrous indicates a compound that contains iron(II), meaning iron in its +2 oxidation state, possibly as the divalent cation Fe2+.  It is opposed to "ferric" or iron(III), meaning iron in its +3 oxidation state, such as the trivalent cation Fe3+. This usage has been largely replaced by the IUPAC nomenclature, which calls for the oxidation state being indicated by Roman numerals in parentheses, such as iron(II) oxide for ferrous oxide (FeO), iron(III) oxide for ferric oxide (Fe2O3), and iron(II,III) oxide for the oxide  that contains both forms of iron.

Outside chemistry, "ferrous" means generally "containing iron". The word is derived from the Latin word  ("iron"). Ferrous metals include steel and pig iron (with a carbon content of a few percent) and alloys of iron with other metals (such as stainless steel). "Non-ferrous" is used to describe metals and alloys that do not contain an appreciable amount of iron.  

The term "ferrous" is usually applied only to metals and alloys.  The adjective ferruginous is used instead to refer to non-metallic substances that contain iron, such as "ferruginous water"; or to an orangish-brown color resembling that of rust.

Gallery

See also

  — Iron(II) compounds
 
 
  (ferrous oxide)
  (ferrous bromide)

References

Iron